An Image: Lee Konitz with Strings is an album by American jazz saxophonist Lee Konitz with an orchestra arranged and conducted by William Russo which was released on the Verve label in 1958.

Track listing 
All compositions by William Russo unless noted.
 "'Round Midnight" (Thelonious Monk, Cootie Williams, Bernie Hanighen) – 5:19 
 "The Daffodil's Smile" – 4:04 
 "I Got It Bad (and That Ain't Good)" (Duke Ellington, Paul Francis Webster) – 2:22 
 "Music for Alto Saxophone and Strings" – 10:03
 "What's New?" (Bob Haggart, Johnny Burke) – 2:44
 "Blues for Our Children" – 6:55 
 "An Image of Man" – 15:23

Personnel 
 Lee Konitz – alto saxophone
 Unidentified orchestra arranged and conducted by William Russo including:
 Gene Orloff – violin
 Alan Shulman – cello
 Lou Stein – piano
 Billy Bauer – guitar

References 

Lee Konitz albums
1958 albums
Verve Records albums
Albums arranged by Bill Russo